The Berlin–Munich high-speed railway is a  high-speed rail line between the German cities of Berlin, Nuremberg, Erfurt, Leipzig and Munich. The line was opened on 10 December 2017. The line was first planned in 1991 as part of the "Travel Project for German Unity" - a scheme of linking up east and west German travel infrastructure after reunification. About two million passengers traveled the route in its first year of operation, exceeding the expectation of the rail operator Deutsche Bahn.

The new line reduced travel time by train between Berlin and Munich from 6 hours to 3 hours and 55 minutes.

Construction began in 1996 and cost about €10 billion ($11.8 billion), making it the most expensive transport project in Germany since reunification. The line traverses the Thuringian Forest and required the construction of 22 tunnels and 29 bridges.

References

External links 
 Deutsche Bahn website

Railway lines in Brandenburg
Railway lines in Berlin
High-speed railway lines in Germany
Railway lines opened in 2017
2017 establishments in Germany